The 1965 football season was São Paulo's 36th season since club's existence.

Overall

{|class="wikitable"
|-
|Games played || 74 (16 Torneio Rio-São Paulo, 40 Campeonato Paulista, 18 Friendly match)
|-
|Games won || 31 (8 Torneio Rio-São Paulo, 13 Campeonato Paulista, 10 Friendly match)
|-
|Games drawn || 16 (2 Torneio Rio-São Paulo, 7 Campeonato Paulista, 7 Friendly match)
|-
|Games lost || 17 (6 Torneio Rio-São Paulo, 10 Campeonato Paulista, 1 Friendly match)
|-
|Goals scored || 119
|-
|Goals conceded || 83
|-
|Goal difference || +36
|-
|Best result || 8–0 (H) v Noroeste - Campeonato Paulista - 1965.11.07
|-
|Worst result || 0–5 (A) v Botafogo - Torneio Rio-São Paulo - 1965.05.150–5 (A) v Palmeiras - Torneio Rio-São Paulo - 1965.05.19
|-
|Most appearances || 
|-
|Top scorer || 
|-|}

Friendlies

Torneio Pentagonal do Recife

Official competitions

Torneio Rio-São Paulo

Record

Campeonato Paulista

Record

External links
official website 

Association football clubs 1965 season
1965
1965 in Brazilian football